Paul J. McAuley (born 23 April 1955) is a British botanist and science fiction author. A biologist by training, McAuley writes mostly hard science fiction. His novels dealing with themes such as biotechnology, alternative history/alternative reality, and space travel.

McAuley began with far-future space opera Four Hundred Billion Stars, its sequel Eternal Light, and the planetary-colony adventure Of the Fall. Red Dust, set on a far-future Mars colonized by the Chinese, is a planetary romance featuring many emerging technologies and SF motifs: nanotechnology, biotechnology, artificial intelligence, personality downloads, virtual reality. The Confluence series, set in an even more distant future (about ten million years from now), is one of a number of novels to use Frank J. Tipler's Omega Point Theory (that the universe seems to be evolving toward a maximum degree of complexity and consciousness) as one of its themes. 
About the same time, he published Pasquale's Angel, set in an alternative Italian Renaissance and featuring Niccolò Machiavegli (Machiavelli) and Leonardo da Vinci as major characters.

McAuley has also used biotechnology and nanotechnology themes in near-future settings: Fairyland describes a dystopian, war-torn Europe where genetically engineered "dolls" are used as disposable slaves. Since 2001 he has produced several SF-based techno-thrillers such as The Secret of Life, Whole Wide World, and White Devils.

Four Hundred Billion Stars, his first novel, won the Philip K. Dick Award in 1988. Fairyland won the 1996 Arthur C. Clarke Award and the 1997 John W. Campbell Memorial Award for Best SF Novel. "The Temptation of Dr. Stein", won the British Fantasy Award. Pasquale's Angel won the Sidewise Award for Alternate History (Long Form).

Bibliography

Novels

Four Hundred Billion Stars Series
 [Philip K. Dick Award winner, 1988]
 Secret Harmonies. London: Gollancz, 1989. . (Published in the United States as Of the Fall)
 Eternal Light. London: Gollancz, 1991.  — BSFA Award nominee, 1991 and Clarke Award nominee, 1992

The Confluence Series
 Child of the River. London: Gollancz, 1997. 
 Ancients of Days. London: Gollancz, 1998. 
 Shrine of Stars. London: Gollancz, 1999. 
 Confluence - The Trilogy. London: Gollancz, 2014.

The Quiet War series
 The Quiet War: London, Gollancz, 2008.  — Clarke Award nominee, 2009
 Gardens of the Sun. London: Gollancz, 2009. 
 In the Mouth of the Whale. London: Gollancz, 2012. 
 Evening's Empires: London, Gollancz, 2013. 
 Stories from the Quiet War (2011), a collection of five stories:
 "Making History", first published in 2000
 "Incomers", first published in 2008
 "Second Skin", first published in 1997 in Asimov's
 "Reef", first published in 2000
 "Karyl’s War", first published in this collection

The Jackaroo series
 Something Coming Through: London, Gollancz, 2015.
 Into Everywhere. London: Gollancz, 2016.
 Dust (short story) (2006)
 Winning Peace (short story) (2007)
 City of the Dead (short story) (2008)
 Adventure (short story) (2008)
 Crimes and Glory (short story) (2009)
 The Choice (short story) (2011)
 Bruce Springsteen (short story) (2012)
 The Man (short story) (2012)
 Something Happened Here, But We're Not Quite Sure What It Was (short story) (2016)

Other novels
 Red Dust. London: Gollancz, 1993. 
 Pasquale's Angel. London: Gollancz, 1994.  — Clarke and British Fantasy Awards nominee, 1995, Sidewise Award winner
 Fairyland. London: Gollancz, 1995.  — BSFA Award nominee, 1995; Clarke Award winner, 1996; Campbell Award winner, 1997
 The Secret of Life. London: Voyager, 2001.  — BSFA Award nominee, 2001; Clarke Award nominee, 2002
 Whole Wide World. London: Voyager, 2002. 
 White Devils. London: Simon & Schuster, 2004.  — Campbell Award nominee, 2005
 Mind's Eye. London: Simon & Schuster, 2005.  — Campbell Award nominee, 2006
 Players. London: Simon & Schuster, 2007. 
 Cowboy Angels. London: Gollancz, 2007. 
 Austral: London: Gollancz, 2017. 
 War of the Maps. London: Gollancz, 2020. 
 Beyond the Burn Line. London: Gollancz, 2022.

Novellas
 Making History. Harrogate: PS Publishing, 2000. 
 The Eye of the Tyger. Tolworth, Surrey: Telos Publishing, 2003.  (a Doctor Who novella)

Collections
 King of the Hill. London: Gollancz, 1988. 
 The King of the Hill
 Karl and the Ogre
 Transcendence
 The Temporary King
 Exiles
 Little Ilya and Spider and Box
 The Airs of Earth
 The Heirs of Earth
 The Invisible Country. London: Gollancz, 1996.  — Philip K. Dick Award nominee, 1998 
 "Gene Wars" (1991)
 Prison Dreams
 "Recording Angel" (1995)
 Dr Luther's Assistant
 "The Temptation of Dr. Stein"  (1996) — set in the same timeline than Pasquale's Angel (1994)
 Children of the Revolution
 The True History of Doctor Pretorius
 Slaves
 Little Machines. Harrogate: PS Publishing, 2005. 
 The Two Dicks
 Residuals
 17
 All Tomorrow's Parties
 Interstitial
 How we Lost the Moon
 Under Mars
 Danger: Hard Hack Area
 The Madness of Crowds
 The Secret of My Success
 The Proxy
 I Spy
 The Rift
 Alien TV
 Before the Flood
 A Very British History
 Cross Roads Blues
 A Very British History. Harrogate: PS Publishing, 2013.
 Little Ilya and Spider and Box
 The Temporary King
 Cross Road Blues
 Gene Wars
 Prison Dreams
 Children of the Revolution
 Recording Angel
 Second Skin
 All Tomorrow's Parties
 17
 Sea Change, With Monsters
 How We Lost the Moon, A True Story by Frank W. Allen
 A Very British History
 The Two Dicks
 Meat
 Rocket Boy
 The Thought War
 City of the Dead
 Little Lost Robot
 Shadow Life
 The Choice

Short Stories
 
 "A Brief Guide To Other Histories"
 "Edna Sharrow"
 "Inheritance"
 "Planet of Fear" (2015) in Old Venus (anthology)
 "Rocket Boy"
 Set in the Jackaroo universe:
 "Winning Peace" (2016), in the collection Galactic Empires by Neil Clarke.
 "Something Happened Here, But We’re Not Quite Sure What It Was" (2016), published as a freebie on Tor.com.

Critical studies and reviews of McAuley's work
 Reviews Cowboy Angels.

References

External links

 Paul J. McAuley's official site
 Infinity Plus profile of Paul J. McAuley
 Profile of Paul McAuley by Michael Swanwick
 
Review, The Secret of Life
Review, The Book of Confluence trilogy
Review, Whole Wide World
Review, Confluence - trilogy omnibus
Interview on Actusf
Complete list of sci-fi award wins and nominations by novel
Story Behind Quiet War (How I wrote the Quiet War novels and stories) - Online Essay at Upcoming4.me
Story behind Confluence by Paul McAuley - Collaborating With Myself - Online Essay at Upcoming4.me

1955 births
British alternative history writers
British biologists
British botanists
British science fiction writers
Sidewise Award winners
Living people
British male novelists